The 2014 Stetson Hatters football team represented Stetson University during the 2014 NCAA Division I FCS football season. They were led by second-year head coach Roger Hughes and played their home games at Spec Martin Stadium. They were a member of the Pioneer Football League. They finished the season 5–7, 3–5 in PFL play to finish in a tie for seventh place.

Schedule

Source: Schedule

Game summaries

at Warner

Florida Tech

Mercer

at Birmingham-Southern

Butler

at San Diego

at Jacksonville

at Davidson

at Campbell

Marist

at Morehead State

Drake

References

Stetson
Stetson Hatters football seasons
Stetson Hatters football